Nakki Lake is a lake situated in the Indian hill station of Mount Abu in Aravalli range.

Geography

The lake is in length of about a half mile and in width about of a quarter of mile and 20 to 30 ft. deep towards the dam on the west. It is an important tourist attraction of Mount Abu. There is the Toad Rock on a hill near the lake. Toad rock is so called as it looks like a toad about to jump into the lake, from the side of the rock facing the lake. There are two ways to go up and down the rock; to climb the rocky hill side or to use the steps leading down to Nakki Lake. By the side of the lake there is a path leading to Sunset Point. It is forbidden to climb to Sunset Point due to wild animals such as bears and leopards roaming around the path to Sunset Point. Raghunath Temple and Maharaja Jaipur Palace are also on hills near the Lake. Boating in the lake and horse rides around the lake are available.

Mahatma Gandhi's ashes were immersed in this holy lake on 12 February 1948 and Gandhi Ghat was constructed.

In Art and Literature

In Fisher's Drawing Room Scrap Book, 1839 is a poetical illustration by Letitia Elizabeth Landon to an engraving of a painting by H. Melville

List of lakes in India
List of lakes in India

References

External links

 
 Panorama of Nakki Lake, Mount Abu

Mount Abu
Reservoirs in Rajasthan
Sacred lakes of India